Christian Bale is an English actor who has received various awards and nominations for his film and television performances. His major nominations include four Academy Awards (one win), four British Academy Film Awards, twelve Critics' Choice Movie Awards (six wins), four Golden Globe Awards (two wins), and seven Screen Actors Guild Awards (two wins). Christian Bale was also nominated to the Nene Lopez Excellence Awards five times (three wins).

Major associations

Academy Awards
The Academy Awards are a set of awards given by the Academy of Motion Picture Arts and Sciences annually for excellence of cinematic achievements.

British Academy Film Awards
The British Academy Film Awards is an annual award show presented by the British Academy of Film and Television Arts (BAFTA) to honour the best British and international contributions to film.

Golden Globe Awards
The Golden Globe Award is an accolade bestowed by the 93 members of the Hollywood Foreign Press Association (HFPA), recognizing excellence in film and television, both domestic and foreign.

Screen Actors Guild Awards
The Screen Actors Guild Awards are organized by the Screen Actors Guild‐American Federation of Television and Radio Artists. First awarded in 1995, the awards aim to recognize excellent achievements in film and television.

Other awards and nominations

AACTA International Awards
The Australian Academy of Cinema and Television Arts Awards are presented annually by the Australian Academy of Cinema and Television Arts (AACTA) to recognize and honor achievements in the film and television industry.

Critics' Choice Movie Awards
The Critics' Choice Movie Awards are presented annually since 1995 by the Broadcast Film Critics Association for outstanding achievements in the cinema industry.

Dorian Awards
The Dorian Awards are organized by the Gay and Lesbian Entertainment Critics Association (GALECA).

Empire Awards
The Empire Awards is a British awards ceremony held annually to recognize cinematic achievements.

European Film Awards

Independent Spirit Awards
The Independent Spirit Awards are presented annually by Film Independent, to award the best in the independent film community.

Irish Film & Television Awards
The Irish Film & Television Academy Awards are presented annually to award the best in films and television.

MTV Movie & TV Awards
The MTV Movie & TV Awards (formerly known as the MTV Movie Awards) is an annual award show presented by MTV to honor outstanding achievements in film and television. Founded in 1992, the nominees are decided by MTV producers and executives; winners are decided online by the audience.

National Board of Review
The National Board of Review was founded in 1909 in New York City to award "film, domestic and foreign, as both art and entertainment".

National Movie Awards

Palm Springs International Film Festival
Founded in 1989 in Palm Springs, California, the Palm Springs International Film Festival is held annually in January.

People's Choice Awards
The People's Choice Awards is an American awards show recognizing the people and the work of popular culture. The show has been held annually since 1975, and is voted on by the general public.

Russian National Movie Awards

Satellite Awards
The Satellite Awards are a set of annual awards given by the International Press Academy.

Saturn Awards
The Academy of Science Fiction, Fantasy and Horror Films present the Saturn Awards for works of science fiction, fantasy, and horror. Since 1973, the awards have been presented to American films, television programs, and other media.

Scream Awards
The Scream Awards are held annually to recognize films in the horror, science fiction, and fantasy genre.

Sitges Film Festival

Teen Choice Awards
The Teen Choice Awards is an annual awards show that airs on the Fox Network. The awards honor the year's biggest achievements in music, movies, sports, television, fashion and other categories, voted by teen viewers.

Young Artist Awards
The Young Hollywood Awards honor young people's achievements in music, film, sports, television, and sports.

Critics associations

See also
 Christian Bale filmography

Notes

References

External links
 

Lists of awards received by British actor